Chern's conjecture for hypersurfaces in spheres, unsolved as of 2018, is a conjecture proposed by Chern in the field of differential geometry. It originates from the Chern's unanswered question:

Is the set of values for  discrete? What is the infimum of these values of ?

The first question, i.e., whether the set of values for σ is discrete, can be reformulated as follows:

Its affirmative hand, more general than the Chern's conjecture for hypersurfaces, sometimes also referred to as the Chern's conjecture and is still, as of 2018, unanswered even with M as a hypersurface (Chern proposed this special case to the Shing-Tung Yau's open problems' list in differential geometry in 1982):

Think of the scalar curvature as a function on this set. Is the image of this function a discrete set of positive numbers?

Formulated alternatively:

Consider closed minimal hypersurfaces  with constant scalar curvature .

This became known as the Chern's conjecture for minimal hypersurfaces in spheres (or Chern's conjecture for minimal hypersurfaces in a sphere)

This hypersurface case was later, thanks to progress in isoparametric hypersurfaces' studies, given a new formulation, now known as Chern's conjecture for isoparametric hypersurfaces in spheres (or Chern's conjecture for isoparametric hypersurfaces in a sphere):

Let  be a closed, minimally immersed hypersurface of the unit sphere  with constant scalar curvature. Then  is isoparametric

Here,  refers to the (n+1)-dimensional sphere, and n ≥ 2.

In 2008, Zhiqin Lu proposed a conjecture similar to that of Chern, but with  taken instead of :

Let  be a closed, minimally immersed submanifold in the unit sphere  with constant . If , then there is a constant  such that

Another related conjecture was proposed by Robert Bryant (mathematician):

Formulated alternatively:

Let  be a minimal hypersurface with constant scalar curvature. Then  is isoparametric

Chern's conjectures hierarchically

Put hierarchically and formulated in a single style, Chern's conjectures (without conjectures of Lu and Bryant) can look like this:

 The first version (minimal hypersurfaces conjecture):

Let  be a compact minimal hypersurface in the unit sphere . If  has constant scalar curvature, then the possible values of the scalar curvature of  form a discrete set

 The refined/stronger version (isoparametric hypersurfaces conjecture) of the conjecture is the same, but with the "if" part being replaced with this:

If  has constant scalar curvature, then  is isoparametric

 The strongest version replaces the "if" part with:

Then we have:
 If , then  is isoparametric, and 

Or alternatively:

Then we have:
 If , then  is isoparametric, and 

One should pay attention to the so-called first and second pinching problems as special parts for Chern.

Other related and still open problems
Besides the conjectures of Lu and Bryant, there're also others:

In 1983, Chia-Kuei Peng and Chuu-Lian Terng proposed the problem related to Chern:

Does there exist a positive constant  depending only on  such that if , then , i.e.,  is one of the Clifford torus ?

In 2017, Li Lei, Hongwei Xu and Zhiyuan Xu proposed 2 Chern-related problems.

The 1st one was inspired by Yau's conjecture on the first eigenvalue:

Denote by  the first eigenvalue of the Laplace operator acting on functions over :

 Is it possible to prove that if  has constant scalar curvature, then ?

 Set .

The second is their own generalized Chern's conjecture for hypersurfaces with constant mean curvature:

Let  be a closed hypersurface with constant mean curvature  in the unit sphere :

 Suppose that , where .

Sources
 S.S. Chern, Minimal Submanifolds in a Riemannian Manifold, (mimeographed in 1968), Department of Mathematics Technical Report 19 (New Series), University of Kansas, 1968
 S.S. Chern, Brief survey of minimal submanifolds, Differentialgeometrie im Großen, volume 4 (1971), Mathematisches Forschungsinstitut Oberwolfach, pp. 43–60
 S.S. Chern, M. do Carmo and S. Kobayashi, Minimal submanifolds of a sphere with second fundamental form of constant length, Functional Analysis and Related Fields: Proceedings of a Conference in honor of Professor Marshall Stone, held at the University of Chicago, May 1968 (1970), Springer-Verlag, pp. 59-75
 S.T. Yau, Seminar on Differential Geometry (Annals of Mathematics Studies, Volume 102), Princeton University Press (1982), pp. 669–706, problem 105
 L. Verstraelen, Sectional curvature of minimal submanifolds, Proceedings of the Workshop on Differential Geometry (1986), University of Southampton, pp. 48–62
 M. Scherfner and S. Weiß, Towards a proof of the Chern conjecture for isoparametric hypersurfaces in spheres, Süddeutsches Kolloquium über Differentialgeometrie, volume 33 (2008), Institut für Diskrete Mathematik und Geometrie, Technische Universität Wien, pp. 1–13
 Z. Lu, Normal scalar curvature conjecture and its applications, Journal of Functional Analysis, volume 261 (2011), pp. 1284–1308
 
 C.K. Peng, C.L. Terng, Minimal hypersurfaces of sphere with constant scalar curvature, Annals of Mathematics Studies, volume 103 (1983), pp. 177–198
 

Conjectures
Unsolved problems in geometry
Differential geometry